Frédéric Lefèvre (born 23 April 1970) is a French former swimmer who competed in the 1992 Summer Olympics and in the 1996 Summer Olympics.

References

1970 births
Living people
French male medley swimmers
French male freestyle swimmers
Olympic swimmers of France
Swimmers at the 1992 Summer Olympics
Swimmers at the 1996 Summer Olympics
Mediterranean Games gold medalists for France
Mediterranean Games medalists in swimming
Swimmers at the 1991 Mediterranean Games
20th-century French people
21st-century French people